Oncology Reports is a peer-reviewed medical journal of oncology published monthly by Spandidos Publications. The editor-in-chief is Demetrios A. Spandidos. The journal was established in 1994.

Abstracting and indexing
The journal is abstracted and indexed in: 

According to the Journal Citation Reports, the journal has a 2021 impact factor of 4.136.

References

External links
 

Oncology journals
Monthly journals
Publications established in 1994
English-language journals
Spandidos Publications academic journals